Fanats FC is a Pakistani football club based in Karachi. Fanats FC is owned and managed by Mohammed Khanani. The club's home ground is the Sharafi Mohammedan Stadium and is currently playing Club 360 Premier League.

History 
Fanats FC was formed in 2005 when football was still not very popular in Karachi. Many other clubs formed alongside Fanats FC but most of them died out and despite going through some difficult times Fanats FC emerged stronger than before.

Stadium 
Fanats FC shares the Korangi Balouch Football Stadium with various football clubs in Karachi.

Squad 
Goalkeepers:

1. Asif Zaman 
2. Mohammed Khanani 
3. Fasih Ahsan 

Defenders:
1. Pervaiz 
2. Adnan Butt 
3. Noman Iqbal (C)
4. Uzair Bhakrani
5. Ikram
6. Atir
7. Junaid

Midfielders:

1. Rayyan Rehman
2. Ali Afghani (VC)
3. Wahaj Siddiqui
4. Talib Shah
5. Mohammed
6. Abdullah

Forwards:

1. Ehtisham Khan
2. Mehtab Hassan
3. Shahmeer
4. USMAN
5. HAMZA ABRAR

Football clubs in Pakistan
2005 establishments in Pakistan
Football in Karachi